The 2011 King's Lynn and West Norfolk Borough Council election took place on 5 May 2011 to elect members of King's Lynn and West Norfolk Borough Council in England. This was on the same day as other local elections.

Election result

|}

References

2011 English local elections
May 2011 events in the United Kingdom
2011
2000s in Norfolk